iOS 15 is the fifteenth major release of the iOS mobile operating system developed by Apple for its iPhone and iPod Touch lines of products. It was announced at the company's Worldwide Developers Conference on June 7, 2021, as the successor to iOS 14, and released to the public on September 20, 2021.

On June 6, 2022, at WWDC 2022, its successor, iOS 16, was announced. iOS 15 was officially succeeded by iOS 16 on September 12, 2022.

iOS 15 is the final version of iOS that supports the iPod Touch, as its successor, iOS 16, drops support for the seventh-generation iPod Touch.

System features

Focus
Focus is a new feature that allows a user to change their "state", such as work, sleep, do not disturb or a custom focus. Based on the selected state, users can set the type of notification they want to receive and from which application. It is also possible to choose which pages and then apps to show on the Home based on the state. The state can change automatically based on where the user is or a time.

Focus also controls the interactions with Contacts, so it is possible to decide which specific contacts can "disturb" the user.

Some Lock Screen settings can be controlled based on the state: for example, the Dim Lock Screen feature, which darkens the lock screen from not showing notifications on that screen, can be automatically turned on or off based on the state.

Focus is synchronized automatically across different iOS and macOS devices on the same iCloud account, as well as any paired watchOS devices.

Notifications
Notifications receive a new look with contact photos for all communication apps and larger app icons. When the notification arrives, the user can mute the corresponding app for one hour or all day.

The Summary allows the user to group and postpone the notifications coming from the chosen apps, delivering them at a scheduled time in a single big notification called summary notification.

Live Text

Devices with an A12 chip or later support Live Text, which uses optical character recognition to recognize text in images, allowing copy-and-paste, look-up, and translation in Photos, Screenshot, Quick Look, Safari, and Live Preview with Camera. This feature uses artificial intelligence text recognition using the Neural Engine.

Smart stacks with suggested Widgets
The Widgets in iOS 15 are now more dynamic: depending on the context, the system can add or remove widgets to existing stacks. For example, near the start of a certain event in the Calendar, the system can decide to add the Calendar Widget to an existing smart stack, if it is not already present, and then remove it at the end of the event.

Cross-App Drag and Drop
Pictures and text can be dragged from one app and dropped in another. This feature was previously only available in iPadOS.

Home
The various Home screens can be reordered, deleted, hidden, or limited using Focus mode.

Per-App Text Size
From the Control Center, the text size can be set per app.

Spotlight
The global search function has been enhanced and it is also available on the lock screen by pulling the page down.

Dictation
Formerly limited to 60 seconds, the Voice-To-Text dictation available in the keyboard is unlimited.

System-wide translation
System-wide translation allows the user to translate text in all apps by selecting it and tapping on the Translate option.

Adjust video playback speed
The system default player, used for videos and by many apps, supports changing playback speed.

Video Effects and Mic Mode
The Control Center supports Video Effects, adding Portrait effect to the camera, and Mic Mode to implement microphone Voice Isolation.

Accessibility improvements

Per-App Accessibility: each app can have a different accessibility setting to customize the text (Bold Text, Larger Text, Button Shapes, On/Off Labels, Reduce Transparency), increase contrast, reduce motion, autoplay video-preview, etc.
Image Exploration with VoiceOver: it describes photos to give users with low vision more context about what's displayed on the photo.
Audible charts: the Audio Graphs accessibility framework allows to represent chart data with audio for blind and low-vision people.

iCloud
Backups to iCloud can now also be made on 5G cellular networks.

RealityKit 2
The new version for augmented reality (AR) uses new APIs to capture objects faster, and supports custom shaders, dynamic assets, custom systems and character control.

Accounts for School and Work
User accounts managed by an organization, such as work or school accounts, can be added without requiring external apps or profiles.

StoreKit 2
StoreKit 2 allows apps to implement the "Request a Refund" option in-app. The users can tap this option, select a specific in-app purchase and identify the problem that led to the refund request.
It also allows developers to monitor the purchases made by their users without using third-party solutions.

App features

FaceTime
iOS 15 adds several new features to FaceTime including:
Grid view for group conversations
Portrait mode, requires A12 Bionic chip or later
Spatial Audio
Voice isolation mode: remove background noise during calls
Wide spectrum mode
FaceTime links and web integration: Allow Android and Microsoft Windows users to join calls
Calendar integration
Mute alerts, which let users know when they are talking while muted
FaceTime can now take advantage of all rear cameras (on compatible devices)
SharePlay allows the user to share their content from compatible video and music apps to a FaceTime call. The user can also share their screen to a FaceTime call.

Memoji
Memoji in iOS 15 have more customization options, including new clothing, two different eye colors, new glasses, new stickers, multicolored headwear, and new accessibility options.

Messages
Multiple images in stack: Messages now displays multiple images in a stack, making them easier to navigate.
Pinned content: the user can pin any content, text or link he/she receives from a contact.
Shared with You: Messages also introduces a new feature called "Shared with You", which organizes links and other content shared via Messages in a dedicated section in their native apps for later viewing (for instance, a news article shared via messages is shown in the News app).

Maps
Apple Maps receives several new features:

Greater depth has been added to the driving maps with the use of 3D modeling, which will make it easier to interpret directions when faced with roads that go over or under the one being driven on, including buildings, bridges and trees.
3D globe with a new color palette and increased mountain, desert, and forest detail
Increased traffic information, turn lanes, bike, bus and taxi lanes, medians, crosswalks
Walking directions in augmented reality on A12 devices or later
Redesigned place cards
Improved filtering for search
The night mode set in Maps now follows the night mode set in the OS instead of activating it only at night and the colors are improved.
Public Transport Info: public transport routes and times with ability to pin favorite routes to the top. In-app notifications will alert users when they need to get off a bus or train. Transit information can be visible on a connected Apple Watch.
Reports and Reviews: the user can report incidents, write reviews and add photos to points of interest, etc.
New features for driving, including a new map where details such as traffic and incidents are highlighted, as well as an itinerary planner that lets the user view a future journey by selecting departure or arrival time.

Photos
The Photos app can now manually set the time, date, and location of a photo. The app also allows the user to view information about the photo such as the camera used to take the photo and the photo's file size. In the Photos app, the user can now look up places that are inside images, however, this feature only works on the Apple A12 chip or later.

Camera
Improved panoramic shooting mode on iPhone 12 and above: less geometric distortion in panoramic shots with elongated fields of view, noise and banding reduction that are formed in the image due to changes in brightness and contrast when moving the camera from side to side, a less blurry and clearer image even when capturing moving subjects within the panorama.

Safari
Safari was completely redesigned, moving the tab bar and address bar to the bottom of the screen, but there is an option to keep the legacy layout. It now has tab groups, allowing users to organize tabs and share entire groups of tabs. The user can now use a pull to refresh gesture to refresh a webpage. Browser extensions are available for the first time in Safari for iOS; they are the same extensions available in Safari for the Mac. Safari will automatically upgrade HTTP URLs to HTTPS if compatible. The WebM audio codec is supported.

Safari opens with a new start page; it is possible to have a custom page on startup that contains sections including favorites, most frequently visited sites, Siri suggestions, etc.

App Clips more discoverable: it is possible to show a full-screen preview of the app clip in Safari.

Weather
Weather received an overhaul, with new animations and weather maps in full screen, and the weather icon was updated. The app also has a next-time precipitation notifications feature which allows the user to get a notification whenever rain or snow is going to start or stop within the next hour for the user’s current location and each saved location, independently.

Siri
Siri can now work offline on device with an A12 Bionic chip or later, responding faster to common requests supported locally without need for Internet connection.

News
Apple News has been completely redesigned, featuring more rounded corners.

Share with Siri
Siri responds to requests such as "Hey Siri, share this with [name]" or "send this to [name]" to share screen content using Messages. Items such as images, web pages, Apple Music or Podcasts, Apple News stories, and Maps locations will share the actual content (or a link to it). For content Siri cannot share, Siri will send a screenshot, notifying the user.

Announce Notifications: with announce notifications update in iOS 15, Siri can read all incoming notifications aloud and allow users to speak a response to them. This can be enabled for specific apps.

Health
Health data can now be shared.

A new monitored parameter called "Walking Steadiness" has been added, which determines the risk of falling using gyroscopic sensors that measure balance, stability, and coordination.

Added the Trend analysis i.e. horizontal lines that show the trend of the various parameters over the long term.

Lab Results allows the user to import laboratory results into the Health app from a healthcare provider.

Files
Groups is a new view mode that groups files of the same type.

The built-in PDF editor can insert pages from existing files or scans, remove pages, and rotate pages. PDFs can also be locked with a password.

Notes
New #tags allow classifying, organizing, then finding the user's notes faster. Smart Folders automatically group various notes based on tags.
Ability to share notes with other collaborators and work on them together. The activity view shows a summary of the changes made by other collaborators before the user's last reading and a day-by-day list of the activities carried out by each collaborator. It is possible to mention @someone in the notes, who will be notified.

Reminders
Ability to insert #tags in reminders to classify them.

Shortcuts

Sound recognition has been added to the automations, so it is possible to execute a customized command when a certain sound is recognized.
New automation triggers based on the current reading of a HomeKit-enabled humidity, air quality, or light level sensor.

Voice Memos
Added new playback options to adjust speed and skip silence.

Wallet
Keys: iPhone is able to unlock select HomeKit-enabled smart locks. Requires an iPhone with an A12 chip or newer.
Identification cards and driver licenses: iPhone can store a copy of a U.S. user's state-issued identity card or driver license. Arizona, Georgia, Connecticut, Iowa, Kentucky, Maryland, Oklahoma, and Utah will be the first states to support the feature. Arizona was the first state to support the feature with iOS 15.4 on March 23, 2022.

Security and privacy

App Privacy Report
By activating this app logging, the user can save a 7-day summary of the times when the various apps access certain data and the domains or websites they visit. This feature was called "Record App Activity" until iOS 15.2, when its functionality was extended.

Siri Improved Privacy
On devices with an Apple A12 chip or later, Siri now converts audio into words on the device itself instead of sending it to Apple servers.

Hide IP address for trackers in Safari
Safari's anti-tracking now prevents known trackers from reading the user real IP address.

Hide IP address for external content in Mail
In the Mail app, the user can enable the setting to hide their IP address when downloading external content that may be present in a mail message. In this way it is possible to privately download this external content without being tracked by spammers or commercial companies that have inserted them without the user's knowledge.

Hide My Email
Hide My Email creates random email addresses that forward to the inbox so e-mail can be sent and received anonymously.

iCloud Private Relay
Private Relay masks the user's IP address in Safari, preserving the region without revealing the actual location. It also protects the DNS query resolution and insecure HTTP traffic in all apps.

Built-in one-time password authenticator With Autofill
The built-in authenticator allows iOS devices to be used to generate verification codes for additional sign-in security of accounts. There is no need to download a separate app because it is integrated into the OS. The verification codes are automatically filled when a user signs in to the site.

WPA3 Hotspot
Hotspot connections now can also use the WPA3 security protocol.

Tethering to/from older iOS devices is not possible as WPA2 compatibility is not fully supported.

Apple Support have said that if enough people put in a feature request they might fix this issue.

CSAM detection
CSAM detection identifying known Child Sexual Abuse Material (CSAM) in photos stored iCloud Photos was originally intended to be included. Implementation of CSAM detection was delayed indefinitely, and cancelled altogether in December 2022. This recognition is based on a perceptual hash called NeuralHash.

Siri and Search were updated to intervene when users perform searches for queries related to CSAM. The Messages app will warn children when receiving or sending sexually explicit photos, blurring sent and received photos. It was originally planned to also notify parents of children under 13 if they choose to view flagged messages anyway, but this was removed due to concerns about abusive parents.

Hardened memory allocation

iOS 15 introduced kalloc_type in order to advance memory safety in the XNU kernel. This is primarily to mitigate privilege escalation vulnerabilities.

Other changes

Supported devices
All the devices supporting iOS 14 support iOS 15. However, devices with an A9, A10 Fusion or A11 Bionic chip, such as the iPhone 6S, iPhone 7, iPhone 8, iPhone X, iPhone SE (1st generation) and the iPod Touch (7th generation), all have limited support. The following is a list of devices that support iOS 15:

iPhone
iPhone 6S & 6S Plus
iPhone SE (1st generation)
iPhone 7 & 7 Plus
iPhone 8 & 8 Plus
iPhone X
iPhone XS & XS Max
iPhone XR
iPhone 11
iPhone 11 Pro & 11 Pro Max
iPhone SE (2nd generation)
iPhone 12 & 12 Mini
iPhone 12 Pro & 12 Pro Max
iPhone 13 & 13 Mini
iPhone 13 Pro & 13 Pro Max
iPhone SE (3rd generation)

iPod Touch
iPod Touch (7th generation)

Release history 

The first developer beta of iOS 15 was released on June 7, 2021, and the first public beta was released on June 30, 2021, six days after the release of the second developer beta. iOS 15 was officially released on September 20, 2021.

See Apple's official release notes, and official security update contents.

See also 
 iPadOS 15
 macOS Monterey
 tvOS 15
 watchOS 8

Notes

References 

15
2021 software
Products introduced in 2021
Mobile operating systems
Proprietary operating systems